Squire Jeremiah is a Nauruan politician.

As of 2012, he was the president of NGO Emendena Eimwi, "recently established" to raise public awareness of corruption and bribery issues in the country, and to lobby the government for more effective measures against these ills. With that aim, he entered politics, and was elected Member of Parliament for Meneng in the June 2013 general election. A fellow member of Emendena Eimwi, Doneke Kepae, also stood for Parliament, but was not elected. As there are no political parties in Nauru, Jeremiah sits as an independent.

References

Members of the Parliament of Nauru
Living people
People from Meneng District
21st-century Nauruan politicians
Year of birth missing (living people)